Edward Timothy Razzall, Lord Razzall,  (born 12 June 1943) is a British Liberal Democrat politician and parliamentarian.

Early life
He was the son of Humphrey Razzall, a Liberal Party member who stood as Liberal Parliamentary Candidate for Scarborough and Whitby in the 1945 general election.

Razzall attended St Paul's School, London before going to Worcester College, Oxford, representing the university at cricket in 1964.

Career
Razzall qualified as a solicitor in 1969 and worked for Frere Cholmeley (later Frere Cholmeley Bischoff), becoming a partner in 1973, and chief executive in 1990 before leaving in 1995 to set up his own corporate finance business (Argonaut Associates). Frere Cholmeley Bischoff encountered financial difficulties and dissolved shortly after his departure, for which some blame was attributed to Razzall.

In 1974, he was elected as a councillor for Mortlake ward in the London Borough of Richmond upon Thames, which he represented for 24 years. During that time, he served as chair of Richmond Council's Policy and Resources Committee for 13 years and as deputy leader 1983–96.  He was succeeded in both roles by Serge Lourie.

In 1986, he became joint-treasurer of the Liberal Party, and then treasurer of the newly merged Liberal Democrats in 1988. He was appointed a Commander of the Order of the British Empire (CBE) in the 1993 New Year Honours and created a Life Peer on 22 October 1997 as Baron Razzall, of Mortlake in the London Borough of Richmond. In July 2002, he was the best man at the marriage of Charles Kennedy (the then Liberal Democrat Leader) to Sarah Gurling.

From 2000 to 2006, he was chair of the Liberal Democrats' Campaigns and Communications Committee. Along with Lord Rennard, he was responsible for running the Liberal Democrats' election campaigns. He stepped down from this post in May 2006, saying he wanted a change and to give his successor a chance to settle into the role before the 2010 general election.

A former House of Lords Liberal Democrat Spokesman on Trade and Industry and Treasurer of the All Party Parliamentary Intellectual Property Group in Parliament, he now serves on various parliamentary committees.

Personal life
Razzall married first in 1965 (divorced 1974) Elizabeth Christina née Wilkinson, and they had a daughter, Katie Razzall, the BBC Newsnight reporter, and a son, James Razzall. Through his second marriage in 1982 (dissolved 2003) to Deirdre Martineau née Taylor-Smith, he became step-father to her two sons and two daughters. In 2008 he was reported to be the partner of Jane Bonham Carter, Baroness Bonham-Carter of Yarnbury. Bonham-Carter has declared the relationship in the House of Lords Register of Interests.

Memoirs
His memoirs, Chance Encounters, were published in October 2014.

Controversy
Lord Razzall attracted criticism in 2008 when it was revealed that he and his partner, Jane Bonham-Carter, a fellow life peer, had both claimed House of Lords expenses for a flat that they shared, although it was not claimed that a breach of the rules had occurred. The House of Lords expenses system was later changed to give peers a flat rate irrespective of their residence.

Honours
 Life Peer (1997)
 CBE (1993)

References

External links
Lord Razzall profile at the site of Liberal Democrats
Tim Razzall's cricketing record for Oxford
Debrett's People of Today
RAZZALL, Baron , Who's Who 2013 (A & C Black, 2013; online edn, Oxford University Press, Dec 2012)

1943 births
Living people
People educated at St Paul's School, London
Alumni of Worcester College, Oxford
Oxford University cricketers
Councillors in the London Borough of Richmond upon Thames
Liberal Democrats (UK) life peers
Life peers created by Elizabeth II
Commanders of the Order of the British Empire
English cricketers
Razzall family
People from Ealing